State Route 54 (SR 54) is a north–south state highway that serves west-central Ohio.  It extends from Urbana in the north, to southeast of Springfield.

History

SR 54 was commissioned in 1923 between its current southern terminus and Indiana state line northwest of Willshire. The highway was routed on to mostly the current alignments of SR 29 and U.S. Route 33 (US 33), and SR 54's current alignment. In 1938 the northern terminus was moved to the Indiana state line west of Celina. One year later SR 54 between Urbana and Indiana state line became SR 29, leaving SR 54 on most of its current alignment. SR 54 formerly traveled along a  concurrency with US 36 and SR 29 into downtown Urbana where it ended at a traffic circle with US 68. By 2013, it was truncated to its current northern terminus just east of the downtown area.

Major intersections

References

External links

054
Transportation in Clark County, Ohio
Transportation in Champaign County, Ohio